Prosoplus parasilis is a species of beetle in the family Cerambycidae. It was described by Stephan von Breuning in 1978.

References

Prosoplus
Beetles described in 1978